King Klunk is a 1933 animated short subject, produced and directed by Walter Lantz. It stars Pooch the Pup, and is the twelfth of the thirteen cartoons featuring that character. The cartoon is a parody of the RKO feature King Kong, which premiered six months earlier to this cartoon's release on September 4, 1933 from Universal Pictures.

Plot
Pooch and a girl coonhound sail into Africa, looking to take photographs of King Klunk, the largest gorilla in the planet.

On the continent, a pack of chimpanzees are doing a dance ritual as well preparing a meal for their gigantic gorilla leader. King Klunk immediately shows up, excited to get his lunch. But seeing the amount of food in the platter is inadequate, he rejects it. While thinking what he should feed on, the hungry gorilla sees Pooch and the girl coonhound walk by from several yards away. King Klunk then quietly captures Pooch's partner and replaces her with a lady chimpanzee.

Pooch, unaware of the exchange, still carries on in his exploration. He even holds the hand of the lady chimpanzee. When he looks back, the pup realizes and is most surprised. As he runs, the lady chimpanzee starts following him, wanting to make Pooch her date.

When King Klunk has the girl coonhound in his grasp and is ready to devour her, the chimpanzee cupid suddenly appears and shoots him with an arrow. In this, rather than eating her, the love-stricken gorilla chooses to merely hold that dog and give warm smiles.

Pooch continues running until he loses the lady chimp. As he runs again, Pooch, without noticing, runs up to the top of King Klunk. The gorilla immediately sees and blows him away where he falls into a pond.

In the pond, Pooch swims toward what looks like a harmless boulder extending above the surface. In turns out suddenly that the rock is actually a dinosaur that rises.

The dinosaur chases Pooch on land but couldn't keep track of its prey. After losing the little dog, the dinosaur then sees the girl coonhound still being held by King Klunk, and therefore wants to make a meal out of her.

Not wanting to relinquish anything, King Klunk puts the girl coonhound safely on a tree and goes on to brawl with the dinosaur. The two beasts trade attacks. Eventually, King Klunk comes out the victor.

When the girl coonhound is back in King Klunk's paw, Pooch swings on jungle vines and rescues her. The two dogs swing their way onto a plateau. As the gorilla goes after them, Pooch and the girl coonhound find a giant egg on a nest and push it toward their chaser. Upon being pinned down by the egg, King Klunk is motionless and admits defeat.

Instead of taking pictures, Pooch and the girl coonhound tie King Klunk to the back of their boat and pull him across the Atlantic. They decide to take their creature to the United States.

On American soil, King Klunk, in chains, is presented at a theater where spectators come to see him. Suddenly, the chimpanzee cupid reappears and shoots him with another arrow. His mood is again changed from bored to in-loved. King Klunk once again set sights on the girl coonhound and starts straining the chains. The spectators panic and flee the theater.

King Klunk is able to escape and starts chasing the crowd on the main street. He eventually finds the girl coonhound, picks her up, and climbs The Empire State Building.

Determined to salvage his sweetheart, Pooch boards a fighter plane and takes off. The little dog then fires his machine gun and cannon at the scaling gorilla. After landing several impacts, Pooch ultimately brings down King Klunk who falls from the building and falls to his death. Pooch and the girl coonhound are together again.

Reception
Motion Picture Herald (September 23, 1933): "Pooch the Pup and his girl in Africa, when a giant ape captures the girl. Pooch rescues her, and they bring back the ape to exhibit in a sideshow. Everything goes well until the ape breaks loose, captures the girl again and escapes to the top of a skyscraper with her. Pooch effects another rescue, via a cartoonist's idea of an aeroplane and destroys the monster. It is an amusing takeoff in cartoon form on King Kong.

Availability
The short is available on The Woody Woodpecker and Friends Classic Cartoon Collection DVD box set.

References

External links
 

1933 films
1930s parody films
American parody films
1930s animated short films
American black-and-white films
Animated films about dinosaurs
Animated films about apes
Films directed by Walter Lantz
Films set in Africa
Giant monster films
Walter Lantz Productions shorts
1930s American animated films
1933 animated films
Universal Pictures animated short films
Animated films about dogs
1933 comedy films
1930s English-language films